Illa is a surname, Catalan Island. Notable people with the surname include:

Esteban Terradas i Illa (1883–1950), Spanish mathematician, scientist, and engineer
Rolando Illa (1880–1937), Cuban-Argentine chess player
Salvador Illa (born 1966), Spanish politician

Catalan-language surnames